Statistics of Swedish football Division 3 for the 1945–46 season.

League standings

Uppsvenska Sydöstra 1945–46

Uppsvenska Sydvästra 1945–46

Östsvenska Norra 1945–46

Östsvenska Södra 1945–46

Centralserien Norra, Uppland 1945–46

Centralserien Norra, Västmanland 1945–46

Centralserien Södra 1945–46

Nordvästra Norra 1945–46

Nordvästra Södra, Dalsland 1945–46

Nordvästra Södra, Bohus 1945–46

Mellansvenska Norra 1945–46

Mellansvenska Södra 1945–46

Sydöstra Norra 1945–46

Sydöstra Södra 1945–46

Västsvenska Norra 1945–46

Västsvenska Södra 1945–46

Sydsvenska Norra 1945–46

Sydsvenska Södra 1945–46

Footnotes

References 

Swedish Football Division 3 seasons
3
Swed